Farson may refer to:

People with the surname 
Daniel Farson (1927–1997), British writer and broadcaster
George Farson (1939–2010), American professional baseball player and manager
John Farson, fictional character from Stephen King's The Dark Tower series of novels
Negley Farson (1890–1960), American author and adventurer
Richard Farson Ph.D. (1926–2017), psychologist, author, and educator

Places 
Farson, Iowa, unincorporated community in Competine Township in northeastern Wapello County, Iowa, United States
Farson, Wyoming, census-designated place (CDP) in Sweetwater County, Wyoming, United States